Alakolamada is a village in Sri Lanka. It is located within Matale District, Central Province, near Maussagala, five miles east of Matale.

Demographics

See also
List of towns in Central Province, Sri Lanka

References

External links

Populated places in Matale District